Zborište is a village in the municipality of Velika Kladuša, Bosnia and Herzegovina. The majority of people who live here are Bosniaks. Zborište has a population of 4,922 people. Zborište's mosque is located in the center of town.

Demographics 
According to the 2013 census, its population was 1,226.

See also
Crvarevac
Varoška Rijeka
Islam in Bosnia
Vrnograč

References

Populated places in Velika Kladuša
Islam in Bosnia and Herzegovina